0.9 is the fourth studio album by French rapper Booba.

0.9 may also refer to:
0.9, a fractional number
0. or 0.999..., a repeating decimal